Abbeville Historic District may refer to:

in the United States
(by state)
Abbeville Commercial Historic District, Abbeville, Louisiana, listed on the National Register of Historic Places (NRHP) in Vermilion Parish, Louisiana
Abbeville Residential Historic District, Abbeville, Louisiana, listed on the NRHP in Vermilion Parish, Louisiana
Downtown Abbeville Historic District, Abbeville, Louisiana, listed on the NRHP in Vermilion Parish, Louisiana
Abbeville (Lancaster, Pennsylvania), NRHP-listed
Abbeville Historic District (Abbeville, South Carolina), NRHP-listed

See also
Abbeville (disambiguation)